An ink cartridge or inkjet cartridge is a component of an inkjet printer that contains the ink that is deposited onto paper during printing.

Each ink cartridge contains one or more ink reservoirs; certain producers also add electronic contacts and a chip that communicates with the printer.

Design

Thermal 
Most consumer inkjet printers, such as those made by Canon, HP, and Lexmark (but not Epson) use a thermal inkjet; inside each partition of the ink reservoir is a heating element with a tiny metal plate or resistor. In response to a signal given by the printer, a tiny current flows through the metal or resistor making it warm, and the ink in contact with the heated resistor is vaporized into a tiny steam bubble inside the nozzle. As a consequence, an ink droplet is forced out of the cartridge nozzle onto the paper. This process takes a fraction of a millisecond.

The printing depends on the smooth flow of ink, which can be hindered if the ink begins to dry at the print head, as can happen when an ink level becomes low. Dried ink can be cleaned from a cartridge print head using 91% denatured isopropyl alcohol (not rubbing alcohol).  Tap water contains contaminants that may clog the print head, so distilled water and a lint-free cloth is recommended.

The ink also acts as a coolant to protect the metal-plate heating elements − when the ink supply is depleted, and printing is attempted, the heating elements in thermal cartridges often burn out, permanently damaging the print head. When the ink first begins to run low, the cartridge should be refilled or replaced, to avoid overheating damage to the print head.

Piezoelectric 
All Epson printers use a piezoelectric crystal in each nozzle instead of a heating element. When current is applied, the crystal changes shape or size, increasing the pressure in the ink channel and thus forcing a droplet of ink from the nozzle. There are two types of crystals used: those that elongate when subjected to electricity or bi-morphs which bend. The ink channels in a piezoelectric ink jet print head can be formed using a variety of techniques, but one common method is lamination of a stack of metal plates, each of which includes precision micro-fabricated features of various shapes (i.e. containing an ink channel, orifice, reservoir and crystal). This cool environment allows use of inks which react badly when heated. For example, roughly 1/1000 of every ink jet is vaporised due to the intense heat, and ink must be designed not the clog the printer with the products of thermal decomposition. It also can make a smaller ink drop in some situations than thermal inkjet schemes.

Parts

Cartridge body 
Stores the ink of the ink cartridge. Others contain hydrophobic foam that prevents refilling.

Printhead 
Some ink cartridges have printheads installed on them. Printheads of ink cartridges consists of four parts:

 Nozzle plate: the part where ink goes through from ink cartridge to paper. 
 Cover plate: covers the nozzles when they are not in use.
 Common ink chamber: where ink is transferred from the body before printing.
 (In piezoelectric printers) piezoelectric substrate: houses the piezoelectric crystal.
 (In thermal printers) metallic plate / resistor: is heated with a weak electrical current which heats the ink.

Variants 
 Color inkjets use the CMYK color model: cyan, magenta, yellow, and the key, black.  Over the years, two distinct forms of black have become available: one that blends readily with other colors for graphical printing, and a near-waterproof variant for text.
 Most modern inkjets carry a black cartridge for text, and either a single CMYK combined or a discrete cartridge for each color; while keeping colors separate was initially rare, it has become common in more recent years.  Some higher-end inkjets offer cartridges for extra colors.
 Some cartridges contain ink specially formulated for printing photographs.
 All printer suppliers produce their own type of ink cartridges. Cartridges for different printers may be incompatible — either physically or electrically.
 Some manufacturers incorporate the printer's head into the cartridge (examples include HP, Dell, and Lexmark), while others such as Epson keep the print head a part of the printer itself.  Both sides make claims regarding their approach leading to lower costs for the consumer.
 More recently Epson has introduced a range of printers that use refillable ink tanks, providing a major reduction in printing cost. This operates similar to continuous ink system printers such as provided by Canon. Epson does not subsidise the cost of these printers termed its "Ecotank" range.

Consumer exploitation lawsuits 
It can sometimes be cheaper to buy a new printer than to replace the set of ink cartridges supplied with the printer. The major printer manufacturers − Hewlett Packard, Lexmark, Dell, Canon, Epson and Brother − use a "razor and blades" business model, often breaking even or losing money selling printers while expecting to make a profit by selling cartridges over the life of the printer. Since much of the printer manufacturers' profits are from ink and toner cartridge sales, some of these companies have taken various actions against aftermarket cartridges.

Some printer manufacturers set up their cartridges to interact with the printer, preventing operation when the ink level is low, or when the cartridge has been refilled. One researcher with the magazine Which? over-rode such an interlocked system and found that in one case he could print up to 38% more good quality pages, after the chip stated that the cartridge was empty. In the United Kingdom, in 2003, the cost of ink has been the subject of an Office of Fair Trading investigation, as Which? magazine has accused manufacturers of a lack of transparency about the price of ink and called for an industry standard for measuring ink cartridge performance. Which? stated that color HP cartridges cost over seven times more per milliliter than 1985 Dom Perignon.

In 2006, Epson lost from a class action lawsuit that claimed Epson inkjet printers and ink cartridges stop printer operation due to "empty" cartridge notifications even when usable ink still remains. Epson settled the case by giving $45 e-coupons in their online stores for people who bought Epson inkjet printers and ink cartridges from April 8, 1999 to May 8, 2006.

In 2010, HP lost from three class action lawsuits: 1.) claims of HP inkjet printers giving false low ink notifications, 2.) claims of cyan ink being spent when printing with black ink, 3.) claims of ink cartridges being disabled by printers upon being detected as "empty" even if they are not yet empty. HP paid $5 million in settlement.

In 2017, Halte à L’Obsolescence Programmêe (HOP) — End Planned Obsolescence — filed a lawsuit and won against Brother, Canon, Epson, HP and other companies for intentionally shortening product lifespans - inkjet printers and ink cartridges included. The companies were fined €15,000.

In September 2018, HP lost a class action lawsuit where plaintiffs claim HP printer firmware updates caused fake error messages upon using third party ink cartridges. HP settled the case with $1.5 million.

In October 2019, Epson was filed a class action complaint for printer firmware updates that prevent printer operation upon detection of third party cartridges.

Pricing 
To save money, many people use compatible ink cartridges from a vendor other than the printer manufacturer. A study by British consumer watchdog Which? found that in some cases, printer ink from the manufacturer is more expensive than champagne. Others use aftermarket inks, refilling their own ink cartridges using a kit that includes bulk ink. The high cost of cartridges has also provided an incentive for counterfeiters to supply cartridges falsely claiming to be made by the original manufacturer. The print cartridge industry lost an estimated $3 billion in 2009 due to this, according to an International Data Corporation estimate.

Another alternative involves modifications of an original cartridge allowing use of continuous ink systems with external ink tanks. Some manufacturers, including Canon and Epson, have introduced new models featuring in-built continuous ink systems. This was seen as a welcome move by users, especially small business owners who rely on bulk-printing solutions, like Internet cafes and small-scale print shops.

Refills and third party replacements 

Since printer cartridges from the original manufacturer are often expensive, demand exists for cheaper third party options. These include:

Ink refill services 
Ink refill services are available in office supplies stores, pharmacies and warehouse clubs such as Office Max, Walgreens and Costco. People simply give them their empty ink cartridges in order for them to be refilled.

Ink Sold in Bulk 
People buy large bottles of ink, ranging from 100 mL to 5 gallons. Ink from these bottles are transferred through syringes or droppers.

Cartridge refill kits 
Cartridge refill kits can contain both ink syringes/droppers, rubber plugs, drill tool, screw driver and sealing tape. These are tools that you will need depending on your cartridge model. Some cartridges needed to be unscrewed or drilled or simply injected, depending on the design.

Re-manufactured cartridges 
Remanufactured toner and ink cartridges makes up 30% of total printer cartridge market. Remanufactured cartridges are recycled cartridges that have been disassembled, cleaned and tested for quality. Worn or damaged parts are replaced and the cartridge is then re-assembled and refilled with ink. Manufacturing costs stay low since remanufactured cartridges do not require many new parts.

Compatible ink cartridges 
Compatible ink cartridges are generic cartridges that are made of 100% new materials instead of remanufactured cartridges.

Continuous ink supply system 
Perhaps the easiest, most trouble-free method of refilling ink cartridges is through the use of a CISS (Continuous Ink Supply System).  A CISS consists of a set of cartridges that have tubes connected to them, through which the ink continuously flows from ink reservoirs on the outside of the printer.  Instead of refilling the cartridges themselves, the user simply refills the bottles on the outside of the printer. Early CIS systems were composed of OEM cartridges that had been drilled and outfitted with fittings to accept the ink delivery tubes, a set of 'ribbon' tubes, and plastic bottles with holes drilled in the caps for the tubes and the vents. Today's CIS systems are mass-produced in China, often incorporating all ink bottles into one partitioned container.  They typically utilize auto-reset chips, which means the cartridges rarely have to be removed from the printer.

Legality of refills and third party replacements 
The legality of this industry was brought to the United States Court of Appeals for the Sixth Circuit in the case of Lexmark Int'l v. Static Control Components. The Court ruled that reverse-engineering the handshaking procedure to enable compatibility did not violate the Digital Millennium Copyright Act. The Supreme Court of the United States also ruled in May 2017 in Impression Products v. Lexmark that companies cannot use patent law to block reuse of products protected by patent once the product is sold, which in the case of ink cartridges, allows the sale of refurbished cartridges both within the United States and overseas.

HP has fiercely defended its printing interests from the refill industry, including filing patent complaints and false advertising lawsuits which allege that inferior ink is not properly differentiated from the original HP ink.

Quality of refills and third party replacements 
Back in 2007, PC World reports that refilled cartridges have higher failure rates, print fewer pages than new cartridges, and demonstrate more on-page problems like streaking, curling, and color bleed. Therefore product or service research is often recommended. In the tests made by Wilhelm Imaging Research, Epson ink is fade-resistant up to 40 years. Ink from remanufactured cartridges are only fade-resistant up to 3.9 years.

Recycling programs 
Many programs have been implemented in the United States and Europe to encourage the recycling of ink cartridges. New York has implemented a recycling law for businesses and consumers regarding toner and ink cartridges. In California the Public Contract Code (PCC) section 12156 encourages businesses to purchase recycled ink and toner cartridges.
In the UK, large compatible cartridge manufacturers have implemented recycling programs in order to receive back empty cartridges for refilling of HP, Lexmark, Dell, etc. cartridges, as no compatible version is readily available.

Faults 

Occasionally an error occurs in a factory which can lead to an ink cartridge developing a fault. While such a case is rare, the cartridge will be irreparable and the customer should seek a refund from the manufacturer. This is not to be confused with a clogged printhead.

See also 

 Arizona Cartridge Remanufacturers Association Inc. v. Lexmark International Inc.
 ROM cartridge
 Inkjet refill kit
 Razor and blades business model
 Toner cartridge
 Ecofont (inksaving font)
 Under cover removal

References 

Computer printers
Inks
Office equipment